Roberto Sorrentino (born 14 August 1955 in Naples) is an Italian football manager and former player, who played as a goalkeeper. He is currently in charge of Chieri.

Playing career
As a goalkeeper, he played for several clubs in Italy, but is mainly remembered for his time with Catania, and even served as the club's captain.

Coaching career
He has worked as head coach for a number of minor league Italian teams, as well as Albanian Superliga club Teuta Durrës.

In June 2022, he was hired by Serie D club Chieri, a few months after his son Stefano was appointed club chairman.

Personal life
Roberto is the father of Italian goalkeeper Stefano Sorrentino.

References

1955 births
Living people
Footballers from Naples
Italian footballers
Association football goalkeepers
Serie A players
Serie D players
Italian football managers
U.S.D. 1913 Seregno Calcio managers
KF Teuta Durrës managers
Italian expatriate football managers
Expatriate football managers in Albania
Italian expatriate sportspeople in Albania
Bologna F.C. 1909 players
Cagliari Calcio players
Paganese Calcio 1926 players
A.S.G. Nocerina players
Vigevano Calcio managers